2905 Plaskett, provisional designation , is a stony Gefionian asteroid from the central regions of the asteroid belt, approximately 10 kilometers in diameter. It was discovered on 24 January 1982, by American astronomer Edward Bowell at the Anderson Mesa Station near Flagstaff, Arizona. The asteroid was named after Canadian astronomers John Stanley Plaskett and Harry Hemley Plaskett.

Orbit and classification 

Plaskett is a member of the Gefion family, a large intermediate belt family, named after 1272 Gefion. It orbits the Sun in the central main-belt at a distance of 2.5–3.1 AU once every 4 years and 8 months (1,716 days; semi-major axis of 2.80 AU). Its orbit has an eccentricity of 0.09 and an inclination of 9° with respect to the ecliptic.

Physical characteristics 

In the SMASS classification, Plaskett is a stony S-type asteroid, which corresponds to the overall spectral type of Gefionian asteroids.

Diameter and albedo 

According to the survey carried out by the NEOWISE mission of NASA's Wide-field Infrared Survey Explorer, Plaskett measures 10.224 kilometers in diameter  and its surface has an albedo of 0.273.

Rotation period 

As of 2017, no rotational lightcurve of Plaskett has been obtained from photometric observations. The body's rotation period, shape and poles remain unknown.

Naming 

This minor planet was named in memory of Canadian astronomer John Stanley Plaskett (1865–1941) and his son Harry Hemley Plaskett (1893–1980). The official naming citation was published by the Minor Planet Center on 10 September 1984.

References

External links 
 Asteroid Lightcurve Database (LCDB), query form (info )
 Dictionary of Minor Planet Names, Google books
 Asteroids and comets rotation curves, CdR – Observatoire de Genève, Raoul Behrend
 Discovery Circumstances: Numbered Minor Planets (1)-(5000) – Minor Planet Center
 
 

002905
Discoveries by Edward L. G. Bowell
Named minor planets
002905
19820124